The 1961 European Cup final was held at the Wankdorf Stadium, Bern on 31 May 1961, and contested by Portuguese side Benfica against Spanish side Barcelona. This was the first final not to include Real Madrid, who had won the previous five finals. Benfica lifted the trophy for the first time, beating Barcelona 3–2.

Benfica midfielder Mario Coluna broke his nose in the eighth minute of the match; not wanting to risk further damage, when Domiciano Cavém put over a cross in the 55th minute, Coluna hung back outside the penalty area. The ball was cleared directly to him and he volleyed it home for Benfica's third goal of the match.

Route to the final
Five-time defending champions Real Madrid were knocked out in the first round by Barcelona, their bitter domestic rivals. After defeating Czechoslovak champions Hradec Králové in the quarter-finals, Barcelona initially drew 2–2 on aggregate with West German champions Hamburger SV in the semi-finals. Since this was before UEFA competitions began using the away goals rule, in order to determine who would advance to the final, a replay was scheduled to be played at a neutral site on 3 May. Barça would qualify for the final by winning the replay 1–0 at the King Baudouin Stadium in Brussels, with Evaristo scoring the decisive goal.

Meanwhile, Benfica reached the final of the competition by eliminating Austrian champions Rapid Wien in a 4–1 semi-final aggregate win. This marked the first time that a team from Portugal had ever progressed this far into the competition.

Match

Details

See also
1960–61 European Cup
FC Barcelona in international football
S.L. Benfica in international football

Notes

References

External links
1960–61 season at the UEFA website

1
European Cup Final 1961
European Cup Final 1961
1961
European Cup Final 1961
European
Euro
Sports competitions in Bern
May 1961 sports events in Europe
20th century in Bern